Cricketer of Year may refer to:

 Any of the ICC Awards:
 Sir Garfield Sobers Trophy - Overall ICC Player of the Year
 ICC Women's Cricketer of the Year
 ICC Test Player of the Year
 ICC ODI Player of the Year
 T20 Player of the Year
 Captain of the Year
 Emerging Player of the Year
 Wisden Cricketers of the Year
 Cricket Writers' Club Young Cricketer of the Year
 PCA Player of the Year, the best of the year in English county cricket
 Wisden Australia's Cricketer of the Year
 Young Wisden Schools Cricketer of the Year